is a header file in the C++ Standard Library. This file has two key components:
, a container template which holds two member objects ( and ) of arbitrary type(s). Additionally, the header defines default relational operators for s which have both types in common.

rel_ops
GCC's implementation declares the  namespace (nested within ) in the following manner:
namespace rel_ops {
	template <class _Tp> inline bool operator !=(const _Tp& __x, const _Tp& __y) { return !(__x == __y); }
	template <class _Tp> inline bool operator  >(const _Tp& __x, const _Tp& __y) { return   __y < __x;   }
	template <class _Tp> inline bool operator <=(const _Tp& __x, const _Tp& __y) { return !(__y < __x);  }
	template <class _Tp> inline bool operator >=(const _Tp& __x, const _Tp& __y) { return !(__x < __y);  }
	}
class A {
	int building;
	int room;
public:
	bool operator ==(const A& other) const {
		return (building == other.building) && (room == other.room);
		}
	bool operator <(const A& other) const {
		return (building < other.building) ||
		   (!(other.building < building) && (room < other.room));
		}
	};
void f1(const A& a1, const A& a2) {
	bool equal = (a1 == a2);       // uses == defined within class A
	bool not_equal = (a1 != a2);       // error: no match for ‘operator!=’ in ‘a1 != a2’
	bool less = (a1 < a2);         // uses  < defined within class A
	bool greater = (a1 > a2);          // error: no match for ‘operator >’ in ‘a1  > a2’
	bool less_equal = (a1 <= a2);      // error: no match for ‘operator<=’ in ‘a1 <= a2’
	bool greater_equal = (a1 >= a2);   // error: no match for ‘operator>=’ in ‘a1 >= a2’
	}
By invoking the  templates, one can assign a default meaning to the remaining relational operators. However, if a similar type-specific (i.e. non-template) operator exists in the current scope, even outside the class definition, the compiler will prefer it instead.

// (continued from above)
#include <utility>
using namespace std::rel_ops;

// below operator supersedes rel_ops
bool operator >=(const A& a1, const A& a2) {
	do_something_else();      // perform some distinguishing side-effect
	return !(a1 < a2);             // but otherwise use same procedure as rel_ops
	};

void f2(const A& a1, const A& a2) {
	bool equal = (a1 == a2);         // uses operator == defined within class A
	bool not_equal = (a1 != a2);        // uses !(a1 == a2) per rel_ops
	bool less = (a1 < a2);           // uses operator  < defined within class A
	bool greater = (a1 > a2);           // uses (a2 < a1) per rel_ops
	bool less_equal = (a1 <= a2);       // uses !(a2 < a1) per rel_ops
	bool greater_equal = (a1 >= a2); // uses global operator >= defined above
	}
template <class _Tp> inline bool operator ==(const _Tp& __x, const _Tp& __y) { return !(__x < __y || __y < __x);  }

pair

GCC's implementation defines the  mechanism as follows.

template<class _T1, class _T2> struct pair {
	typedef _T1 first_type;
	typedef _T2 second_type;
	_T1 first;
	_T2 second;
	pair(): first(), second() { }
	pair(const _T1& __a, const _T2& __b): first(__a), second(__b) { }
	template<class _U1, class _U2> pair(const pair<_U1, _U2>& __p) : first(__p.first), second(__p.second) { }
	};

Additionally this header defines all six relational operators for  instances with both types in common. These define a strict weak ordering for objects of type , based on the  elements and then upon the  elements only when the  ones are equal. 
// continued from above

template<class _T1, class _T2> inline bool operator ==(const pair<_T1, _T2>& __x, const pair<_T1, _T2>& __y)
	{ return __x.first == __y.first && __x.second == __y.second; }
template<class _T1, class _T2> inline bool operator  <(const pair<_T1, _T2>& __x, const pair<_T1, _T2>& __y)
	{ return __x.first < __y.first || (!(__y.first < __x.first) && __x.second < __y.second); }
template<class _T1, class _T2> inline bool operator !=(const pair<_T1, _T2>& __x, const pair<_T1, _T2>& __y)
	{ return !(__x == __y); }
template<class _T1, class _T2> inline bool operator >(const pair<_T1, _T2>& __x, const pair<_T1, _T2>& __y)
	{ return __y < __x; }
template<class _T1, class _T2> inline bool operator<=(const pair<_T1, _T2>& __x, const pair<_T1, _T2>& __y)
	{ return !(__y < __x); }
template<class _T1, class _T2> inline bool operator>=(const pair<_T1, _T2>& __x, const pair<_T1, _T2>& __y)
	{ return !(__x < __y); }
Additionally the header contains a template-function  which deduces its return type based on parameters:
// continued from above
template<class _T1, class _T2> inline pair<_T1, _T2> make_pair(_T1 __x, _T2 __y)
	{ return pair<_T1, _T2>(__x, __y); }

See also
Relational operator

References

External links
 C++ reference for general utilities library

C++ Standard Library